Aeterni may refer to:

The Papal Bull Aeterni regis was issued on 21 June 1481 by Pope Sixtus IV
Aeterni Patris, an 1879 encyclical of Pope Leo XIII
Immensa Aeterni Dei, an apostolic constitution in the form of a papal bull issued by Pope Sixtus V on February, 1588